Calothamnus chrysanthereus , commonly known as claw flower is a plant in the myrtle family, Myrtaceae and is endemic to the south-west of Western Australia. It is an erect shrub with needle-shaped leaves crowded on the ends of the branches and bright red flowers in spring. (In 2014 Craven, Edwards and Cowley proposed that the species be renamed Melaleuca chrysantherea.)

Description

The flowers are arranged in clusters or loose spikes of up to 10, mostly on the older leafless stems. The stamens are bright red and arranged in 5 claw-like bundles with 24 to 28 stamens per bundle.

Taxonomy and naming
Claw flower was first formally described in 1862 by Ferdinand von Mueller in Fragmenta Phytographiae Australiae. In 1867, George Bentham made a complete description, giving the name Calothamnus chrysantherus. In 2010, Alex George restored the name Calothamnus chrysanthereus .

Distribution and habitat
This calothamnus is common in the heathlands north of Geraldton in the Geraldton Sandplains and Yalgoo biogeographic regions. It grows in sandy soil in a range of situations.

Conservation
Calothamnus chrysanthereus is classified as "not threatened" by the Western Australian government Department of Parks and Wildlife.

References

chrysanthereus
Myrtales of Australia
Plants described in 1862
Endemic flora of Western Australia
Taxa named by Ferdinand von Mueller